The Lafferty Limestone is a Middle to Late Silurian geologic formation in the Ozark Plateaus of Arkansas.  The name was introduced in 1921 by Hugh Dinsmore Miser in his study of Arkansas, replacing part of the upper St. Clair Limestone. Miser designated a type locality at Tate Spring, located 1.25 miles north of the site of the old Penters Bluff railroad station in Izard County, Arkansas, however, he did not assign a stratotype. As of 2017, a reference section has not been designated for this unit.

Paleofauna

Conodonts

 Acodus
 A. inornatus
 A. unicostatus
 Belodella
 B. triangularis
 Distacodus
 D. mehli
 D. posterocostatus
 D. procerus
 Hindeodella
 H. equidentata

 Ligonodina
 L. silurica
 Lonchodina
 L. cristagalli
 L. walliseri
 Neoprioniodus
 N. excavatus
 N. multiformis
 Ozarkodina
 O. fundamentata
 O. media
 O. ziegleri

 Paltodus
 P. multicostatus
 P. trigonius
 Panderodus
 P. gracilis
 P. simplex
 P. unicostatus
 Plectospathodus
 P. extensus
 P. flexuosus

 Polygnathoides
 P. siluricus
 Polygnathus
 P. lignuiformis
 Spathognathodus
 S. hemiexpansis
 S. primus
 Trichonodella
 T. excavata
 T. inconstans

See also

 List of fossiliferous stratigraphic units in Arkansas
 Paleontology in Arkansas

References

Silurian Arkansas